Prince Maurizio of Savoy, Duke of Montferrat (Maurizio Giuseppe Maria; 13 December 1762 – 1 September 1799) was a member of the Royal House of Savoy.

Biography

Prince Maurizio was born at the Royal Palace of Turin in 1762. He was the ninth child but the fourth son of King Victor Amadeus of Savoy (then styled the "Duke of Savoy") and Queen Maria Antonia Ferdinanda of Spain. He was styled the Duke of Montferrat from birth. The capital of Montferrat, Casale Monferrato, was the scene of great celebration at his birth in his honour. As a royal prince, he received an appanage of 20 Million Piedmont scudo.

To escape the threat of Napoleon I, the duke of Montferrat fled to Sardinia with his brothers Victor Emmanuel and Charles Felix where the trio lived in the Palazzo Carcassona.

His oldest brother Charles Emmanuel fled to Rome. In June 1799 his brother Charles Emmanuel created him Governor of the province of Sassari. Montferrat died on the island in 1799. He died of malaria and was buried at the Cathedral of Alghero. His younger brother Giuseppe, Count of Asti also died of malaria in 1802.

Ancestry

References

1753 births
1799 deaths
Princes of Savoy
Nobility from Turin
Deaths from malaria
Italian royalty
Dukes of Montferrat
18th-century Italian people
Burials at Alghero Cathedral
Sons of kings